Hiezan may refer to:

Mount Hiei (also known as Hieizan or Hiezan)
Enryaku-ji (Mount Hiei or Hieizan Temple and Monastery) in Japan